"La Isla Bonita" is a song by American singer Madonna from her third studio album True Blue (1986). Written and produced by Madonna and Patrick Leonard, with additional lyrics by Bruce Gaitsch, the song was originally presented by Leonard as an instrumental demo to Michael Jackson, who turned it down; Leonard then played it to Madonna, who liked it and wrote the lyrics and melodies. "La Isla Bonita" was Madonna's first song with Latin influences; its instrumentation features Cuban drums, Spanish guitar arrangements, maracas and harmonicas. The lyrics refer to an island named San Pedro; according to Madonna, the song is a tribute to the beauty of Latinos.

Upon its release as the fifth and final single from True Blue on February 25, 1987, "La Isla Bonita" was positively received by music critics. It was also commercially successful, becoming her 11th top five hit on the Billboard Hot 100, and second Adult Contemporary number one; it topped the charts across several countries in Europe, including the United Kingdom, where it became her fourth number one. In the accompanying music video, Madonna portrays two opposite characters: a young Catholic woman, and a flamenco dancer; academics applauded the clip for using Hispanic fashion and symbolism as icons of beauty and romance. Retrospective reviewers have rated "La Isla Bonita" as one of Madonna's best songs. It features on her compilation albums The Immaculate Collection (1990) and Celebration (2009), and has been performed in seven of Madonna's concert tours. "La Isla Bonita" has been covered by multiple artists, including Ricky Martin and Alizée.

Background and release 

In 1985, Madonna started writing and recording songs for her third studio album, True Blue; she decided to bring back producer Stephen Bray, with whom she had worked on her previous album Like a Virgin (1984), and also hired a new producer, Patrick Leonard. Leonard had previously worked with Michael Jackson on 1984's Victory Tour; he recalled that after the tour concluded, Jackson's manager Quincy Jones asked him to write "something sort of Sade-like" for the singer. One of the instrumental demos Leonard submitted for Jackson's approval had "some form of a vocal", and included the phrase "La Isla Bonita", but Jackson and Jones did not like it and rejected it. After meeting with Madonna to start working on True Blue, Leonard showed her the demo, and she worked on it to create some of the lyrics and melodies; "it wouldn't have occurred to me to do anything like that with her. But she liked it", Leonard recalled.

"La Isla Bonita" was the first song Madonna recorded that incorporated Spanish motifs and lyrics; She and Leonard would go on to work together on other similarly Latin-inspired songs, such as "Who’s That Girl" ―from the soundtrack of the film of the same name―and "Spanish Eyes" ―from Like a Prayer (1989). To get the translations correct, they talked over the phone with a Hispanic housekeeper. Of working with the producer on the song, Madonna recalled, "Latin rhythms often dominate our uptempo compositions[...] It's like we're possessed. [Leonard and I] both think that we were Latin in another life". She then referred to "La Isla Bonita" as her tribute to the "beauty and mystery of Latin American people". The location of the titular island has been debated, with Cuba, Belize, Puerto Rico, and the Dominican Republic being cited as possibilities. Several sources have speculated that San Pedro Town in Ambergris Caye, Belize, is the factual geographical location; on its official website, the island's Victoria House Resort & Spa posted that the town has been nicknamed "La Isla Bonita" because of the song. During an interview with Rolling Stone, Madonna herself admitted to not knowing where San Pedro was: "I don't know [where San Pedro is]. At that point, I wasn't a person who went on holidays to beautiful islands. I may have been on the way to the studio and seen an exit ramp for San Pedro".

"La Isla Bonita" was released as the fifth and final single from True Blue on February 25, 1987. It was included on Madonna's compilation albums The Immaculate Collection (1990) and Celebration (2009), as well as on the Japanese edition of Something to Remember (1995). In 2014, while working on her thirteenth studio album Rebel Heart (2015) with producer Diplo, Madonna recorded a dubplate of "La Isla Bonita" with new lyrics that referenced trio Major Lazer; this version premiered in March 2015 on BBC Radio 1Xtra.

Composition 

"La Isla Bonita" was written and produced by Madonna and Leonard, with additional lyrics by Bruce Gaitsch. Personnel working on the song included Leonard on the keyboard arrangement and programming, Gaitsch on guitars, and Paulinho da Costa as percussionist; background vocals were performed by Siedah Garrett and Edie Lehmann. Described as a Latin pop song by author Rikky Rooksby, the single features instrumentation from Cuban drums, Spanish guitar, maracas, harmonicas, and a mix of synthesized and real drumming. According to the sheet music published by Alfred Publishing Inc., "La Isla Bonita" is set in the time signature of common time, with a tempo of 100 beats per minute. It is written in the key of C minor, with Madonna's voice in a high register, spanning between F13 to G.

Lyrically, it describes a "humble observer, captured by the rhythm of an imagined island", and has four lines sung in Spanish. The title "La Isla Bonita" translates to "The Pretty Island". The song starts with a musical introduction performed on bongos, before descending into synthesized beats from castanets. Madonna sings the chorus in the same G3 to C5 range; after the second chorus, there is a Spanish guitar interlude where her voice expands to F minor, which can be heard when she sings "I want to be where the sun warms the sky", before coming down to C minor when she sings the phrase "loves a girl". Toward the end, there is another musical interlude with a harmonica and another chorus. Ending with a gradual fade-out, the song has Madonna utter the words "Él dijo que te ama (He said he loves you)".

Critical reception 
Upon release, "La Isla Bonita" was met with positive reviews from music critics and authors. In his biography of the singer, J. Randy Taraborrelli deemed it an "exotic [...] enchanting, uptempo Spanish-themed song with an equally enchanting melody". Similarly, in Rock and Roll is Here to Stay (2000), William McKeen referred to it as "tranquil", and as an example of the "Latin-flavored sweet[s] that Blondie could never resist". For Creems Ken Barnes, "['La Isla Bonita'] is no 'Open Your Heart', but its lilting (yet reflective) quality transcends the south-of-the-border cliches". Slant Magazines Sal Cinquemani named it "timeless", and one of Madonna's "biggest, most influential hits". From Entertainment Weekly, Chuck Arnold added that the single explored Latin pop "before it became trendy", and noted influence on other songs, such as Lady Gaga's "Alejandro" (2010). AllMusic's Stewart Mason considered it True Blues "most prescient" track, that sounds "fresh and enjoyably new"; he further singled out the singer's "purring" vocals as one of her "sexiest and most understated performances". Dawn Keetley in Public Women, Public Words said it was "smooth [and] transparent", as well as one of Madonna's "most perfect" songs.

For Lucy O'Brien, True Blues "sense of romantic thrill" is reflected in songs like "La Isla Bonita". Writing for the New York Times, Jon Pareles said it was one of the singer's "friendlier" love songs. From the Houston Chronicle, Marty Racine considered it one of the album's standout tracks, opining that it is "almost romantic, even if smacks of an overnight fling, where being true-blue is not so difficult". Author Maury Dean felt it was a "tough tune for most males to shrug off". "La Isla Bonita" was referred to as "spunky" by John Leland for Spin, while Jan DeKnock from the Chicago Tribune said it was "charming". For Entertainment Weeklys David Browne, "a 30-ish urban sophisticate [...] making Carmen Miranda-does-MTV moves ought to sound ridiculous. With the help of collaborators like Stephen Bray and Patrick Leonard, though [...] [it] turns into a perfectly conceived pop record". 

Retrospective reviews have been positive. "La Isla Bonita" came in at number 20 of The Tabs ranking of Madonna's singles; author Harrison Brocklehurst compared it favorably to "Holiday" (1983), and referred to it as "sunset in a song". It is Madonna's 40th and 30th best song for the staff of Rolling Stone and The Guardians Jude Rogers, respectively. Entertainment Weeklys Chuck Arnold named the song Madonna's 19th best: "this island-breezy ditty is certainly one of the loveliest tunes that [she] has ever done", Arnold wrote. For the staff of Billboard, it was the artist's 14th best song. Bianca Gracie said it was "one of the most romantic songs in her catalog", and applauded her "mature, lush vocals". Nick Levine from NME also named it one of her most romantic, as well as a "shimmering Latin pop gem that’s [...] ever so slightly melancholic". "La Isla Bonita" was named Madonna's 10th and 11th best song by PinkNews Mayer Nassim, and The Backlot's Louis Virtel, respectively; the former called it the "ultimate holiday romance", and the latter, one of her "most timeless tracks [...] As a romance, it’s touching, and as a personal reflection, it’s beautiful".  Despite naming it one of her best singles, the HuffPosts Matthew Jacobs opined that "you have to be in the right mood for this one – its middling tempo can feel like a slog". On a similar note, Gay Star News Joe Morgan said it was a "divisive" classic.

Commercial performance 

On March 21, 1987, "La Isla Bonita" debuted at number 49 on the Billboard Hot 100, becoming Madonna's 11th consecutive single to be named the week's top new entry, a streak that began in 1984 with "Lucky Star"; it was also one of the most added songs on radio stations. By April 25, the song became Madonna's 12th consecutive top ten hit, a record shared with Michael Jackson; "La Isla Bonita" was the fifth top ten hit from True Blue, making it the second album by a female artist to score five top ten hits―the first being Janet Jackson's Control (1986). On May 2, the song reached its peak at number 4, becoming Madonna's 11th top five hit, a feat surpassed at the time only by the Beatles and Elvis Presley.

On the Adult Contemporary chart, the single debuted at number 31 on the week of April 4, peaking at number one more than a month later. It was Madonna's second Adult Contemporary chart-topper after "Live to Tell". "La Isla Bonita" also reached number one on the Hot Dance Singles Sales chart. Billboard reported that 75,000copies of the 12-inch single had been sold by July 1987. "La Isla Bonita" came in at number 58 on Billboard Hot 100 year-end chart for 1987, and at 34 of the Adult Contemporary year-end chart. In Canada, the single debuted in the 58th position of RPMs Top Singles chart on the week of April 4; after ten weeks on the chart, it reached the top position on June 6, 1987. "La Isla Bonita" placed at number 22 on the RPM Year-end chart for 1987.

In the United Kingdom, "La Isla Bonita" debuted at the 5th position of the singles chart on April 4; it reached the first position two weeks later, spending two weeks at number one and eleven on the chart overall. It was Madonna's fourth number one in the country. The single was certified silver by the British Phonographic Industry (BPI) for shipment of 250,000copies of the single. According to Music Week magazine, 421,760copies of the single had been sold in the United Kingdom as of 2008. "La Isla Bonita" was Madonna's first number one song in France, where it spent three weeks at the top spot in July 1987, and was certified gold by the Syndicat National de l'Édition Phonographique (SNEP) for shipment of 500,000copies. It remains one of Madonna's highest-selling singles in the country, with reported sales exceeding 620,000units. The song was successful across Europe as well, topping the charts in Switzerland, Germany, and Austria. "La Isla Bonita" also topped the European Hot 100 Singles chart the week of June 20, 1987. It reached the top five in Ireland, Norway, the Netherlands, and Sweden, and the top ten in Spain.

Music video

Background and synopsis 

The music video for "La Isla Bonita" was directed by Mary Lambert, who had previously worked with Madonna in the videos for "Borderline" and "Like a Virgin" (1984). Filming took place in downtown Los Angeles in March 1987, and lasted four days; over 500 extras of Hispanic descent, including a then-unknown Benicio Del Toro, who was paid $150, participated in the shooting. According to Sharon Oreck, in her book, Video Slut (2010), it was a very simple shooting. In the visual, Madonna plays two characters: a short-haired Catholic woman and a "flamboyant" flamenco dancer. As the flamenco dancer, she is dressed in a voluminous red Andalusian-style dress; for the shy, pious Catholic character, she dons a simple white dress.

The video starts as several Latin people dance in a Spanish barrio while Madonna, as the Catholic woman, watches them from her window; she sheds tears in her room and reluctantly ignores their invitation to join them. At one point, she is shown using a rosary to pray, bowing before an altar full of Catholic imagery. The "passionate" flamenco dancer Madonna dances inside a bright red room with red candles and candelabra and, towards the end, leaves to join the dancers in the streets. "La Isla Bonita" had its world premiere on MTV on March 6, 1987, and became the most requested video in the channel's history for a record-breaking 20 consecutive weeks. In Europe, it was the year's most heavily rotated clip on television. It can be found on Madonna's video compilations The Immaculate Collection (1990) and Celebration: The Video Collection (2009).

Analysis and reception 
According to Santiago Fouz-Hernández and Freya Jarman-Ivens, authors of Madonna's Drowned Worlds (2004), the "austerity and the passivity" of the Catholic character contrasts vividly with the "passion and activity" of the flamenco dancer. In The Madonna Connection: Representational Politics, Subcultural Identities, and Cultural Theory (1998), authors Ramona Liera-Schwichtenberg, Deidre Pribram, David Tetzlaff and Ron Scott argued that although the settings suggest that both of Madonna's characters live in the barrio and may be Latina themselves, her portrayal of the flamenco dancer—which he described as "lush, flashy [and] colorful"—contrasts with the Latinos in the street, who are decked out in "sparsely worn out" clothes. The authors said that although she dances and even flirts with them, she does not get really involved. Similarly, Fouz-Hernández and Jarman-Ivens wrote that the "reality" of Madonna's characters is different from that of the Latinos, who are portrayed as poor. In Totally Awesome 80s (1995), Matthew Rettenmund noted a link between Latino culture and Catholicism, represented by Madonna's two characters.

The video was also appreciated for its use of Hispanic fashion as an icon of beauty and romanticism; for example, Colleen McDanell, in her book Material Christianity (1998), applauded Madonna for giving "new meaning" to candlestands and "home shrines". Douglas Kellner noted that Madonna's "multiculturalism" and "transgressive moves" helped her appeal to "large and varied youth audiences". Madonna's Spanish-inspired look from the video—boleros, layered skirts with rosary beads and crucifixes—became a fashion trend at the time. "La Isla Bonita" was named Madonna's 34th and 20th best music video by Louis Virtel and Sal Cinquemani, respectively; the staff of Rolling Stone described it as "one of her most theatrical". 

In a less favorable review, Ryan Murphy, writing for The Spokesman-Review, panned it for being "lame, overdone, [and] almost absurd". Murphy compared it negatively to the singer's previous True Blue videos, further noticing a "pervading sense of humor [that's] not supposed to be there", specifically in the scene when Madonna dances out in the street. As of 2018, "La Isla Bonita" was one of the singer's most viewed music videos on YouTube.

Live performances 
"La Isla Bonita" has been included on seven of Madonna's concert tours: Who's That Girl (1987), The Girlie Show (1993), Drowned World (2001), Confessions (2006), Sticky & Sweet (2008–2009), Rebel Heart (2015–2016), and Madame X (2019–2020). On the first one, she wore a Spanish cabaret dress, and was joined by her backup singers Niki Haris, Donna De Lory, and Debra Parson. Jon Pareles from The New York Times opined that Madonna resembled a "tropical temptress" during the number. Two different performances can be found on the videos Who's That Girl: Live in Japan and Ciao Italia: Live from Italy, filmed in Tokyo on June and in Turin on September, respectively. On The Girlie Show, Madonna performed the song on top of a rising platform, decked in a blue and white striped shirt, while the dancers were dressed as sailors. One of them was bare-chested and played acoustic guitar as she sang. From The Baltimore Sun, J. D. Considine praised Madonna's musical chemistry with "her first-rate backing band". The performance recorded on November 19, 1993, at the Sydney Cricket Ground, was included on The Girlie Show: Live Down Under home video release (1994).

"La Isla Bonita" was one of only two of Madonna's 1980s singles performed on the Drowned World Tour. Decked out in black slacks, a backless black dress, and surrounded by a "gaggle of percussionists and dancers", she played acoustic guitar in an "unplugged flamenco" version of the song. Reviewing the London concert, NME Alex Needham pointed out that "by the time ['La Isla Bonita'] rolls around, the relief in the audience is palpable and [Madonna] also finally seems relaxed". The performance on August 26, 2001, at Detroit's Palace of Auburn Hills, was recorded and released on the live video album Drowned World Tour 2001. Madonna sang a "disco-enhanced" version of "La Isla Bonita" on her Confessions Tour; she wore a one-shouldered unitard with ribbons of purple Swarovski crystals across the torso, similar to the one worn by the singers of ABBA, designed by Jean Paul Gaultier. The backdrop screen showed a video that mirrored the "voluptuousness of [her] dancing", according to Slant Magazine Ed Gonzalez. The performance from the August 15–16 London concerts was included on the singer's second live album, The Confessions Tour (2007).

On July 7, 2007, Madonna and gypsy punk band Gogol Bordello performed a "crazed hoedown" version of "La Isla Bonita" at the London Live Earth concert. For the Sticky & Sweet Tour, "La Isla Bonita" was given a gypsy theme, with instrumentation from fiddles and accordions. In the number, Madonna gripped a rose in her teeth and was joined by Romani musicians and dancers, including the Ukrainian group Kolpakov Trio. The Denver Posts Ricardo Baca considered the performance "the show's brightest, boldest, most daring moment — a triumph of reinvention, like Madonna herself". The performance was included on the Sticky & Sweet Tour live album release (2010), recorded during the four concerts in Buenos Aires, Argentina.

On the Rebel Heart Tour, Madonna did a flamenco rendition of the song complete with "stomps, claps and shouts". She wore a matador traje de luces with a giant M embroidered on the back, custom-made by a Spanish tailor from Zaragoza. Pitchfork T. Cole Rachel noted that "La Isla Bonita" was one of the tour's numbers that "resulted in nearly deafening arena-sized sing-alongs". The song's performance at the March 19–20, 2016 shows in Sydney's Allphones Arena was recorded and released on Madonna's fifth live album, Rebel Heart Tour (2017). On July 27, 2017, Madonna sang "La Isla Bonita" on Leonardo DiCaprio's annual fundraising gala in Saint-Tropez, France.

A guitar cha-cha-chá mashup of "La Isla Bonita" and a song titled "Welcome to My Fado Club" was performed on the singer's Madame X Tour. The stage was set up as a Lisbon nightclub, and Madonna changed the lyrics to "my Portuguese lullaby". At one point, she took off one of her gloves and said, "this is as X-rated as it's gonna get tonight". For the Los Angeles Daily News, Kelli Skye Fadroski opined that Madonna "soared" through the number. On October 9, 2021, following the release of the Madame X concert film, Madonna gave an "intimate cabaret performance" in the basement of Marcus Samuelsson's Harlem restaurant Red Rooster, and sang lounge renditions of "La Isla Bonita", Madame X album tracks "Dark Ballet" and "Crazy" (2019), and Cape Verdean coladeira song "Sodade"; she was dressed in a black cocktail dress with a "dramatic leg slit", lace gloves, and long blonde wig.

Covers and usage 

In 1986, before Madonna released "La Isla Bonita" as a single, Dutch singer Micaela released a cover of the song, which peaked at number 25 in the Netherlands; in July 1987, a cover by Mexican singer Byanka reached number 45 on the Billboard Hot Latin Songs chart. In 1999, "La Isla Bonita" was sampled by Chilean singer Deetah on her song "El Paraiso Rico", from her album Deadly Cha Cha. American rapper Black Rob's song "Spanish Fly", included on his album Life Story (2000), features Jennifer Lopez singing a chorus based on "La Isla Bonita". In 2004, American actor David Hasselhoff included a rendition on his album Sings America. That same year, American rapper Mase sampled the song's hook for his own "My Harlem Lullaby", found on the album Welcome Back. In 2008, French singer Alizée posted a cover of the song on her official MySpace page; a studio version was then included on the Mexican Tour Edition of her third studio album, Psychédélices, and became a top ten airplay hit in Mexico.

In 2010, American blogger Perez Hilton released "Gagalupe", a parody of "La Isla Bonita" with lyrics that mocked Madonna's beliefs. The next year, "Love 2 Love U", an unreleased song by American singer Britney Spears that heavily sampled "La Isla Bonita", leaked online. Aired in February 2012, the twelfth episode of the third season of American television series Glee, "The Spanish Teacher", had guest star Ricky Martin singing the song with actress Naya Rivera, who played the character Santana Lopez. This cover peaked at number 99 on the US Billboard Hot 100 and number 93 on the Canadian Hot 100 chart. "Mamacita", a 2020 song by American group Black Eyed Peas and Puerto Rican singer Ozuna, samples "La Isla Bonita".

Track listing and formats 

 US 7-inch single
 "La Isla Bonita"  – 4:01
 "La Isla Bonita" (instrumental remix) – 4:20

 UK 7-inch single
 "La Isla Bonita" (7-inch remix) – 4:01
 "La Isla Bonita" (instrumental remix) – 4:20

 US and German 12-inch maxi-single
 "La Isla Bonita" (extended remix) – 5:28
 "La Isla Bonita" (instrumental) – 5:14

 Digital single
 "La Isla Bonita" – 4:05
 "La Isla Bonita" (Remix Edit) – 4:06
 "La Isla Bonita" (Extended Remix) – 5:33
 "La Isla Bonita" (Instrumental Extended Remix) – 5:23

 1992 Australian and Japanese CD Super Mix; 2019 Record Store Day exclusive green vinyl
 "La Isla Bonita" (extended remix) – 5:28
 "Open Your Heart" (extended version) – 10:38
 "Gambler" – 3:58
 "Crazy for You" – 4:12
 "La Isla Bonita" (instrumental) – 5:21

Credits and personnel 
Credits are adapted from the True Blue album and 12-inch single liner notes.
 Madonna – songwriter, producer, vocals
 Bruce Gaitsch – guitar, (Spanish and acoustic guitar), songwriter
 Patrick Leonard – drum programming, keyboard, songwriter, producer
 Jonathan Moffett– drums
 Paulinho da Costa – percussion
 Siedah Garrett, Edie Lehmann – background vocals
 Michael Verdick – audio mixing, engineer
 Herb Ritts – photography
 Jeri McManus – design

Charts

Weekly charts

Year-end charts

Certifications and sales

References

Bibliography

External links 
 

1986 songs
1987 singles
Alizée songs
European Hot 100 Singles number-one singles
Latin pop songs
Madonna songs
Music videos directed by Mary Lambert
Spanglish songs
Number-one singles in Austria
Number-one singles in Germany
Number-one singles in Iceland
Number-one singles in Switzerland
RPM Top Singles number-one singles
SNEP Top Singles number-one singles
Sire Records singles
Songs written by Bruce Gaitsch
Songs written by Madonna
Songs written by Patrick Leonard
Song recordings produced by Madonna
Song recordings produced by Patrick Leonard
UK Singles Chart number-one singles
Warner Records singles